Robert Gregory Bourdon (born January 20, 1979) is an American musician, best known as the drummer and co-founding member of the American rock band Linkin Park.

Early life
Bourdon was born in Calabasas, California. He received classical piano lessons at a young age. He was inspired to play the drums after attending an Aerosmith concert, where he was personally introduced to drummer Joey Kramer. He also cites Tower of Power and Earth, Wind and Fire as his early influences. Bourdon attended Agoura High School in Agoura Hills where het met future bandmates Brad Delson and Mike Shinoda, in the high school's jazz band. Bourdon waited tables at a restaurant and worked as a party coordinator at a bowling alley prior to becoming a full-time musician. He attended Santa Monica College where he studied accounting.

Career biography 
Bourdon and Brad Delson formed their own band, Relative Degree. The band played a sell-out concert at the Roxy Theatre before breaking up. 

Bourdon later joined Delson and Mike Shinoda to form Linkin Park in 1996. The band enjoyed mainstream success with their debut album Hybrid Theory (2000), which would later go on to become 12× Platinum by the Recording Industry Association of America. Bourdon served as Linkin Park's drummer for seven studio albums and many international tours. Beyond drums and percussion, he also handled the band's business operations with Delson and Dave Farrell. Bourdon injured his back during the production of the band's sixth studio album, The Hunting Party, after playing for 10 hours a day for 7  consecutive days but later recovered. He remained with Linkin Park through 2017, when the band went on hiatus following the death of front man and vocalist Chester Bennington.

Personal life
Bourdon dated actress Vanessa Lee Evigan from 2001 to 2007. He dated model Irina Shayk from 2007 to 2009. Bourdon resides in Los Angeles. He is Jewish.

Discography

With Linkin Park 

 Hybrid Theory (2000)
 Meteora (2003)
 Minutes to Midnight (2007)
 A Thousand Suns (2010)
 Living Things (2012)
 The Hunting Party (2014)
 One More Light (2017)

References

External links 

1979 births
Living people
American rock drummers
Linkin Park members
Nu metal drummers
People from Calabasas, California
20th-century American drummers
American male drummers
21st-century American drummers